Essential or essentials may refer to:

Biology
Essential amino acid, one that the organism cannot produce by itself

Groups and organizations
 EQ Media Group, formerly Essential Media Group, a global television production company
 Essential Media Communications, an Australian PR and polling company
Essential Products, a smart device company led by Andy Rubin
Essential Records (London), a subsidiary of London Records
Essential Records (Christian), a Christian subsidiary of Sony BMG Music Entertainment
The Essentials (band), a Canadian a cappella group formed in 1993
Essentials (PlayStation), a budget package of PlayStation games

Albums
 Essential (Divinyls album), a compilation album, 1991
 Essential (Pet Shop Boys album), 1998
 Essential (Ramones album), 2007
 Essential (CeCe Peniston album), 2000
 Essential (Jethro Tull album)
 Essential (Kate Ryan album), 2008
 Essential (Praga Khan album), 2005
 Essentials (Nate Dogg album), a compilation album, 2002
 Essentials (Failure album), 2006
Essentials, a studio album by Argentine jazz singer Karen Souza, 2011
Essential, a compilation album by Amanda Lear, 2001
Essential, a compilation album by The Human League, 2011
Essentials, an album by Travis Tritt
Essentials, an album by Triumvirat
 Essential series, a collection of compilation albums published by Sony's Legacy Recordings label

Other uses
Essentialism, the philosophical view that an entity must have certain characteristics in order to belong to a certain defined group
Essentials (magazine), a monthly British women's lifestyle magazine

See also
The Essential (disambiguation)
The Essentials (disambiguation)
Essence